Poland competed at the 1936 Summer Olympics in Berlin, Germany. 144 competitors, 127 men and 17 women took part in 55 events in 15 sports.

Medalists

| width="78%" align="left" valign="top" |

Athletics 

Men
Track & road events

Field events

Combined events – Decathlon

Women
Track & road events

Field events

Basketball

Men's tournament

Roster

Coach: Walenty Kłyszejko

Zdzisław Filipkiewicz
Florian Grzechowiak
Zdzisław Kasprzak
Jakub Kopf

Ewaryst Łój
Janusz Patrzykont
Andrzej Pluciński
Zenon Różycki

Paweł Stok
Edward Szostak

First round

Second round

Second consolation round

Third round

Fourth round

Semifinals

Bronze medal match

Boxing

Men

Canoeing

Sprint
Men

Cycling

Four cyclists, all men, represented Poland in 1936.

Road

Equestrian

Eventing

Show jumping

Fencing

11 fencers, all men, represented Poland in 1936.

 Men

Ranks given are within the pool.

Football

Men's tournament

Roster

Coach: Józef Kałuża

Spirydion Albański
Franciszek Cebulak
Ewald Dytko 
Hubert Gad
Antoni Gałecki 
Wilhelm Góra
Walerian Kisieliński
Józef Kotlarczyk

Henryk Martyna
Michał Matyas 
Walenty Musielak 
Teodor Peterek
Ryszard Piec
Friedrich Scherfke 
Władysław Szczepaniak

Jan Wasiewicz  
Gerard Wodarz 
Marian Fontowicz  
Edward Madejski 
Wilhelm Piec   
Alojzy Sitko 
Jerzy Wostal

First round

Quarterfinals

Semifinals

Bronze medal match

Gymnastics

Women

Rowing

Poland had eleven rowers (only men were competing at that time) participate in five out of seven rowing events in 1936.

Sailing

Open

Shooting

Men

Swimming

Men

Wrestling

Men's Greco-Roman

Art competitions

References

External links
Official Olympic Reports
International Olympic Committee results database

Nations at the 1936 Summer Olympics
1936
1936 in Polish sport